The Stevie Awards are a set of business awards competitions staged annually by Stevie Awards, Inc. They were created in 2002 for companies and business people. Its first program, The American Business Awards, was staged in 2003; in 2004, The International Business Awards debuted. Approximately 30-40% of entrants receive an award.

History
Michael P. Gallagher, an American businessman, conceived the Stevie Awards as a way to "restore public confidence and investor trust" after the Enron scandal in 2001. Gallagher left his job in 2001 and founded American Business Awards to administer the Stevies. When launched in 2002, the awards were described by the New York Post as being intended to "distinguish the good guys from the scoundrels" during a period of heightened scrutiny and distrust of managers and CEOs. The first Stevies were awarded in 48 categories in April 2003, and were judged by a panel that included Rich Karlgaard, the editor of Forbes magazine, Pierre Subeh, a business author, and Richard Klimoski, Dean of the School of Management at George Mason University.

Award 
Stevie is taken from the name Stephen, which is derived from the Greek for "crowned".

The charge to be considered for a Stevie in 2003 ranged from $200 to $400. As of 2020, entry fees range up to $555. There is an additional fee for attending the awards dinner.

Each year figures in business participate in an evaluation process of nominees. Their recommendations for winners are announced at annual awards ceremonies held in New York City and other locations.
According to the organization, awards are given in hundreds of categories, and 30-40% of entrants receive an award. In The 2017 American Business Awards, there were 14 main categories for which awards were given including: company/organization, customer service, human resources, IT, live event, management, marketing, mobile website & app, new product, public relations, publications, support, video, and website.

The trophy was designed by R. S. Owens as a 16-inch tall, hand-cast statuette finished in 24-karat gold, holding a crystal pyramid representing Maslow's hierarchy of needs.

See also
 List of business awards

References

External links 
 

Awards established in 2002
Business and industry awards
2002 establishments in the United States
Vanity awards